The 2000 Supercoppa Italiana was a match contested by the 1999–2000 Serie A winners Lazio and the 1999–2000 Coppa Italia runners-up Internazionale. Since the Coppa Italia winners were also the newly appointed league champions, the Super Cup spot was given to the runners-up of the Coppa Italia, Internazionale.

The match resulted in a 4–3 win for Lazio.

Match details

References

2000
Supercoppa 2000
Supercoppa 2000
Supercoppa Italiana